Nicolas Michael Angelis (29 April 1944 – 30 May 2020) was an English actor. He was best known for his television roles as Chrissie Todd in Boys from the Blackstuff, Martin Niarchos in G.B.H. and as a UK narrator of the British children's series Thomas & Friends from 1991 to 2012, as well as several other products and media related to the franchise.

Early life and career 

Nicolas Michael Angelis was born on 29 April 1944 in Paddington, London to an English mother, Margaret (née McCulla) (1920–1947), and a Greek father, Evangelos Angelis (1894–1959). He was raised in Dingle, Liverpool. He trained at the Royal Scottish Academy of Music and Drama, Glasgow, where he played roles in, among other works,  Brendan Behan's The Hostage and The Zykovs by Maxim Gorky. He was featured in Boys from the Black Stuff (1982) and G.B.H.. 

Angelis appeared in comedies such as The Liver Birds (1975–1978) and Luv (1993–1994) and films such as A Nightingale Sang in Berkeley Square (1979) and No Surrender (1985). In 1983, he appeared at the Royal Exchange, Manchester in Harold Pinter's The Caretaker. He was a villain in the revived television series Auf Wiedersehen, Pet (2002), alongside former fellow Black Stuff star Alan Igbon. He narrated the British version of Thomas & Friends from 1991 to 2012. 

He narrated John Peel's autobiography, Margrave of the Marshes, which was broadcast on BBC Radio 4 in 2005. In 2006 he starred in Fated, a film set in Liverpool, and in 2007 he appeared in episodes of Midsomer Murders and The Bill. In September 2011 he participated in the BBC Radio 4 programme The Reunion, talking with other cast members about Boys from the Blackstuff.

Personal life
Angelis married the Coronation Street actress Helen Worth in 1991, although they had been a couple since the mid 1970s. They divorced in 2001, following his much-publicised affair with the woman who would become his second wife, Welsh model Jennifer Khalastchi, whom he married in 2003. He and Worth remained friends.

He was the younger brother of fellow actor Paul Angelis.

Death
Angelis died from a heart attack at his home in Berkshire on 30 May 2020, at the age of 76.

Filmography

Film

Television

Video games

References

External links

1944 births
2020 deaths
20th-century English male actors
21st-century English male actors
Alumni of the Royal Conservatoire of Scotland
English male film actors
English male television actors
English male voice actors
English people of Greek descent
People from Dingle
Male actors from Liverpool